Clifford F. Graham is a St. Thomian corporate executive and former Democratic member of the Legislature of the U.S. Virgin Islands from the St. Thomas/St. John District. In April 2017, U.S.V.I. governor Kenneth Mapp appointed Graham as head of the West Indian Company (W.I.C.O.) to replace Joseph Boschulte as President and CEO.

References 

Senators of the Legislature of the United States Virgin Islands
21st-century American politicians
Living people
Democratic Party of the Virgin Islands politicians
United States Virgin Islands politicians
People from Saint Thomas, U.S. Virgin Islands
Year of birth missing (living people)